The 2018–19 EHF Cup was the 38th edition of the EHF Cup, the second most important European handball club competition organised by the European Handball Federation (EHF), and the sixth edition since the merger with the EHF Cup Winners' Cup.

Team allocation

Teams

Round and draw dates
The schedule of the competition was as follows (all draws were held at the EHF headquarters in Vienna, Austria).

Qualification stage
The qualification stage consists of three rounds, which are played as two-legged ties using a home-and-away system. In the draws for each round, teams are allocated into two pots, with teams from Pot 1 facing teams from Pot 2. The winners of each pairing (highlighted in bold) qualified for the following round.

For each round, teams listed first will play the first leg at home. In some cases, teams agree to play both matches at the same venue.

Round 1
A total of 22 teams entered the draw for the first qualification round, which was held on Tuesday, 17 July 2018. The draw seeding pots were composed as follows:

The first legs were played on 1–2 and the second legs were played on 8–9 September 2018.

|}
Notes

1 Both legs were hosted by B.S.B. Batumi.
2 Both legs were hosted by Talent Robstav M.A.T. Plzeň.

Round 2
The first legs were played on 6–7 October and the second legs were played on 13–14 October 2018. Some teams agreed to play both matches in the same venue.

|}
Notes

1 Both legs were hosted by Karviná.
2 Both legs were hosted by HC Dobrogea Sud Constanța.
3 Both legs were hosted by SL Benfica.

Round 3
A total of 32 teams entered the draw for the third qualification round, which was held on Tuesday, 16 October 2018.
The draw seeding pots were composed as follows:

The first legs were played on 17–18 November and the second legs were played on 24–25 November 2018.

|}

Group stage 

The draw of the EHF Cup group stage took place on Thursday, 29 November 2018. The 16 teams allocated into four pots were drawn into four groups of four teams.

In each group, teams play against each other home-and-away in a round-robin format. The matchdays are  9–10 February, 16–17 February, 23–24 February, 2–3 March, 23–24 March and 30–31 March 2019.

In the group stage, teams are ranked according to points (2 points for a win, 1 point for a draw, 0 points for a loss). After completion of the group stage, if two or more teams have scored the same number of points, the ranking will be determined as follows:

Highest number of points in matches between the teams directly involved;
Superior goal difference in matches between the teams directly involved;
Highest number of goals scored in matches between the teams directly involved (or in the away match in case of a two-team tie);
Superior goal difference in all matches of the group;
Highest number of plus goals in all matches of the group;
If the ranking of one of these teams is determined, the above criteria are consecutively followed until the ranking of all teams is determined. If no ranking can be determined, a decision shall be obtained by EHF through drawing of lots.

During the group stage, only criteria 4–5 apply to determine the provisional ranking of teams.

Group A

Group B

Group C

Group D

Ranking of the second-placed teams
The top three second-placed teams will qualify to the quarter-finals.  The ranking of the second-placed teams will be determined on the basis of  the team's results in the group stage.

Knockout stage

Quarter-finals
Since THW Kiel won their group, they qualified directly for the EHF Cup Finals and will not have to play the quarter-finals. In this case, the quarter-finals will consist of only three two-legged fixtures.
The draw for the quarter-final pairings was held on Tuesday, 2 April, at 11:00 CET in the EHF headquarters in Vienna.  The three group winners were placed in Pot 1, and the three best second-ranked teams were placed in Pot 2. The group winners started the quarter-finals with an away match on 20 and 21 April, and played the second leg at home on 27 and 28 April. 

|}

Matches

Füchse Berlin won 64–54 on aggregate.

TTH Holstebro won 52–50 on aggregate.

FC Porto won 64–60 on aggregate.

Final four
The seventh edition of the EHF Cup Finals in 2019 was hosted by THW Kiel after the EHF Executive Committee decided to award the hosting rights to the German club at its meeting on 6 December 2018. The tournament took place at Sparkassen-Arena in Kiel, on 17 and 18 May 2019. The draw was held on 30 April 2019.

As group winners, THW Kiel avoided playing the quarter-finals and qualified directly for the EHF Cup Finals.

Bracket

Semifinals

Third place game

Final

Top goalscorers

See also
2018–19 EHF Champions League
2018–19 EHF Challenge Cup
2018–19 Women's EHF Cup

References

External links
Official website

 
EHF Cup seasons
EHF Cup
EHF Cup